Woman's Realm was a British weekly women's magazine first published in 1958. One of the editors-in-chief was Joyce Wards. In 2001 it was merged with Woman's Weekly.

The Belle & Sebastian song "Women's Realm" makes reference to this magazine (with the singular "woman" appearing in the lyrics).

References

1958 establishments in the United Kingdom
2001 disestablishments in the United Kingdom
Weekly magazines published in the United Kingdom
Defunct women's magazines published in the United Kingdom
Magazines established in 1958
Magazines disestablished in 2001